The 1993 World Rowing Championships were World Rowing Championships that were held from 30 August to 5 September 1993 at Račice, Czech Republic.

Medal summary

Men's events

Women's events

Medal table

References

World Rowing Championships
Rowing Championships
Rowing competitions in the Czech Republic
1993 in Czech sport
Rowing
Rowing